The J. Pierpont Morgan, named after legendary banking titan J. P. Morgan, was a  American steel-hulled, propeller-driven Great Lakes freighter that was a product of the Chicago Shipbuilding Company of Chicago, Illinois. The Morgan hauled bulk cargoes such as iron ore, coal, grain and occasionally limestone across the Great Lakes of Canada and North America. She served her whole career without any major incidents. She was the first of three identical sister ships, these were the Henry H. Rogers and the Norman B. Ream.

Queen of the Lakes

The J. Pierpont Morgan was the Queen of the Lakes, when launched – i.e. the longest ship on the Great Lakes.  She was Queen of the Lakes from April 12, 1906, to August 18, 1906.  According to Mark L. Thompson, author of Queen of the Lakes, she was the first of the "600-footers", a series of dozens of lake freighters built to her design.  Thompson wrote that "the design of the Morgan represented a plateau of perfection in the endless evolution of the bulk freighter."

According to Thompson, prior to the construction of the J. Pierpont Morgan, vessel design re-use rarely extended for than three or four sister ships.  But, he wrote, between 56 and 76 vessels were built to her design.

Name change and modifications

The Morgan was launched on April 28, 1906, as hull #68. She was built for the Pittsburgh Steamship Company of Cleveland, Ohio. The Morgan played an important role in Great Lakes shipping industry, because she was the first 600-foot vessel on the lakes. Because of her enormous size the Morgan was awarded the unofficial title "Queen of the Lakes".

The Morgan had two new Babcock & Wilcox water tube boilers installed in April 1937. The Morgan had two hopper sides and a new tank top installed in April 1940. In 1952 the Morgan was purchased by U.S. Steel. In November 1960 the Morgan was laid up in Duluth, Minnesota. She remained in layup until 1965 when the Morgan was purchased by the Canadian company, Comet Enterprises Ltd. of Hamilton, Bermuda. The Morgan was rebuilt in 1965, in Port Arthur. She returned to the lakes in 1966, named Heron Bay. On November 4, 1978, the Heron Bay was laid up in Lauzon, Quebec. That same year the Heron Bay was sold to the Union Pipe & Machinery Ltd. of Montreal, Quebec, where she was renamed Heron B. On March 30, 1979, the scrapping of the Heron B began in Lauzon, Quebec. The scrapping was completed in late 1979.

See also

1940 Armistice Day Blizzard
Great Lakes Storm of 1913
List of storms on the Great Lakes
Mataafa Storm
Largest shipwrecks on the Great Lakes
List of shipwrecks on the Great Lakes
SS Edmund Fitzgerald
SS Carl D. Bradley
SS Cedarville
SS Chester A. Congdon
SS James Carruthers
SS Henry B. Smith
SS Emperor
SS Isaac M. Scott (1909)
SS Charles S. Price
SS D.M. Clemson (1903)

References

Great Lakes freighters
1906 ships
Ships built in Chicago
Queen of the Lakes
Merchant ships of the United States
Steamships of the United States
Ships powered by a triple expansion steam engine